The Legacy of Pretoria is a 1934 German drama film directed by Johannes Meyer and starring Paul Hartmann, Charlotte Susa and Paul Henckels. It was based on the novel Die Reise nach Pretoria by Ludwig von Wohl. A German man inherits a business in South Africa, but struggles to run it.

It was shot at the Bavaria Studios in Munich. The film's sets were designed by the art director Max Seefelder.

Cast

References

Bibliography

External links

1934 films
German drama films
1930s German-language films
Films directed by Johannes Meyer
Films based on German novels
Films set in South Africa
Films of Nazi Germany
Films shot at Bavaria Studios
Bavaria Film films
German black-and-white films
1934 drama films
1930s German films